The 2019–20 Georgia Tech Yellow Jackets women's basketball team represented Georgia Institute of Technology during the 2019-20 NCAA Division I women's basketball season. They were led by first-year head coach Nell Fortner and played their home games at Hank McCamish Pavilion as members of the Atlantic Coast Conference.

The Yellow Jackets finished the season 20–11 and 10–8 in ACC play to finish in seventh place.  As the seventh seed in the ACC tournament, they defeated Pittsburgh in the Second Round before losing to eventual champion NC State in Quarterfinals.  The NCAA tournament and WNIT were cancelled due to the COVID-19 outbreak.

Previous season
They finished the 2018–19 season 17–13, 7–9 in ACC play to finish in ninth place. They advanced to the second round of the ACC women's tournament where they lost to North Carolina. Despite having 17 wins, they were not invited to a postseason tournament for the first time since 2013.

Off-season

Recruiting Class

Source:

Roster

Schedule

|-
!colspan=9 style=""| Exhibition

|-
!colspan=9 style=""| Non-conference regular season

|-
!colspan=9 style=""| ACC regular season

|-
!colspan=9 style=""| ACC Women's Tournament

Source

Rankings

See also
2019–20 Georgia Tech Yellow Jackets men's basketball team

References

Georgia Tech Yellow Jackets women's basketball seasons
Georgia Tech